Faiz Ahmad (1946 – 12 November 1986) was an Afghan revolutionary and the founding leader of the Afghanistan Liberation Organization (ALO), a Marxist–Leninist organization established in Kabul.

Biography 
Ahmad was born in Kandahar to a Persian-speaking ethnic Tajik family. He attended primary and secondary schools in Kandahar before coming to Kabul to enter Naderia High School where he eventually became involved in the leftist movement after reading some works of Marx and Lenin.

Akram Yari, a leader of the Maoist movement in Afghanistan, was Ahmad's teacher in Naderia High School; he deeply influenced Ahmad. Yari was leader of Progressive Youth Organization (PYO), a Maoist organization which was formed on 6 October 1965. Later, Ahmad broke with PYO and formed the Revolutionary Group of People of Afghanistan.

After graduating from high school, Ahmad entered the Medical Faculty of Kabul University. It was in those years that he established the Revolutionary Group of People of Afghanistan which was later named Afghanistan Liberation Organization (ALO).

In 1976, Ahmad married Meena Keshwar Kamal.

During the onset of the Soviet invasion of Afghanistan, Faiz Ahmad, instrumental to the reorganization of the Afghanistan Liberation Organization, set the slogan "All resources at the service of liberation fronts!" as the interim objective of all "revolutionary struggle". During this time and under Faiz's leadership, the ALO decided to join the Islamist political forces in forming united fronts against the Soviet Union and the PDPA government.

He wrote Mash'al-i Rehayi (The Beacon of Emancipation, an ALO political-theoretical publication) where he analyzed the situation and established political and strategic lines for ALO activities.

Ahmad was assassinated along with six other ALO members by Gulbuddin Hekmatyar's Hezb-i-Islami on 12 November 1986 in Peshawar, Pakistan.

References

External links 
Web site of Afghanistan Liberation Organization
Website of Biography (Author:Ferdous)

1946 births
1986 deaths
People from Kandahar
Afghan Tajik people
Afghan communists
Anti-revisionists
Afghan revolutionaries
Maoists
Maoism in Afghanistan
Afghan people murdered abroad